Andrew Parker (born 11 January 1965) is a Jamaican track and field athlete who competed in the 110 metres hurdles. He won the event at the 1987 Pan American Games and represented Jamaica at the 1988 Summer Olympics as well as the 1987 World Championships in Athletics.

Career

His first international medal came at the 1983 CARIFTA Games, where he was the gold medallist in the high hurdles. A 110 m and 400 metres hurdles double followed at the 1984 Central American and Caribbean Junior Championships in Athletics held in San Juan, Puerto Rico.

He studied at Arizona State University in the United States and competed collegiately for them as part of the Arizona State Sun Devils track and field team. He won the hurdles title twice consecutively at the Pac-10 Conference meet from 1986 to 1987. He also received three All-America honours in NCAA competition: twice in the 55 metres hurdles (1985, 1986) and once over the 110 m hurdles (1987).

Parker was selected to represent Jamaica in the 110 m hurdles at the 1987 Pan American Games in Indianapolis. American Greg Foster was the reigning world champion and the favourite for the event. However, his team mate Cletus Clark fell mid-race and as a result a hurdle flew into Foster's path, throwing him off balance. Parker took advantage of the mellee between his two main competitors and sped away to claim the Pan American gold medal. Later that month, Parker headed to the 1987 World Championships in Athletics in Rome. He was eliminated in the first round, while his Pan American rival Foster retained the world title.

A year later, Parker made his Olympic debut at the age of 23 and reached the hurdles quarter-finals at the 1988 Seoul Olympics. His final international medal came at the 1989 Central American and Caribbean Championships in Athletics where he was the silver medallist behind Cuba's Emilio Valle, who ran a championship record.

Achievements

References

External links

Living people
1965 births
Jamaican male hurdlers
Arizona State Sun Devils men's track and field athletes
Olympic athletes of Jamaica
Athletes (track and field) at the 1988 Summer Olympics
Pan American Games medalists in athletics (track and field)
Pan American Games gold medalists for Jamaica
Athletes (track and field) at the 1987 Pan American Games
World Athletics Championships athletes for Jamaica
Medalists at the 1987 Pan American Games